The Sheriff of Tarbert was the sheriff principal of Tarbertshire. The position continued in existence until 1633, when it was amalgamated into the position of the Sheriff of Argyll.

Past sheriffs

16th century
William Hardy 1553

References

Tarbert
Argyll and Bute